The school UWC Red Cross Nordic (Norwegian: UWC Røde Kors Nordisk), formerly known as Red Cross Nordic United World College, was founded in 1995, located in Norway. It is the ninth member of the today 18 United World Colleges, others having been established in Wales, Canada, Hong Kong, Italy, India, Singapore, Swaziland, United States, Costa Rica, the Netherlands, Bosnia & Herzegovina, Germany, Armenia, China, Thailand, Japan, and Tanzania. Patrons of the college and the movement include Nelson Mandela, Queen Noor of Jordan and Queen Sonja of Norway. The first college, UWC Atlantic College, was established by the German educationalist Kurt Hahn to promote international understanding and peace. Students are selected by UWC National Committees or selection contacts in over 150 countries on merit and many receive full scholarships. After the two-year education following the guidelines of the International Baccalaureate Diploma Program students usually go on to higher education. UWC students are eligible to participate in the Shelby Davis Scholarship program, which funds undergraduate studies (based on need) for UWC students at many US universities. The school is led by the Rektor, Pelham Lindfield Roberts, Deputy Rektor, Natasha Lambert and the Board of Governors, currently chaired by  Elizabeth Sellevold.

Location and facilities

The college enrolls 200 students aged 16 to 20 from more than 80 different nations, including teenagers from SOS Children's Villages and refugees. The College not only focuses on academics, but also seeks to find a balance between studies, community services and activities. It lies alongside the Red Cross Haugland Rehabilitation Centre. The two institutions work closely together and share many facilities. The College has become a reality through the cooperative efforts of many organizations including the Norwegian National Committee of UWC, the Norwegian Red Cross and the host municipality of Fjaler. UWC Red Cross Nordic was set up with support from all Nordic countries, which provide the funding for the yearly running of it. In addition private sponsors have supported the building program and recent renovation efforts.

Activities

Activities offered at the college include, among many others, climbing, kayaking and hiking, Model United Nations (MUN), environmental groups and musical activities. The college also raises political awareness through presentations held by external guest speakers and students on political issues which are open to the whole college and the surrounding community. Further, the college participates in aid projects and works very closely together with the local and national Red Cross. The school also has its own Red Cross Youth group. Many staff members and all students offer a range of activities to youngsters from many Norwegian schools during one week courses in spring, summer and autumn. This is organized through the college Leirskule (Camp School) program which is led by staff with the additional support of EVS volunteers.

Aims
The aim of UWC is to use education as a force to unite peoples, nations and cultures for peace and a sustainable future. UWC Red Cross Nordic, with a special emphasis on Nordic, environmental and humanitarian concerns, brings highly motivated young students from all parts of the world so they can live and learn together. The college's objective is to help students become active, involved and educated citizens whose attitudes towards understanding and service will be a powerful catalyst for change. Through these students, who are selected on merit as representatives of their countries, UWCRCN hopes to influence their wider communities to become more understanding, compassionate and peaceful. The international UWC organization aims "to create a better and more tolerant world”.

Notable pupils
Mette Karlsvik (1978-)
Mark Wang (1981-)
David Moinina Sengeh (1987?-)
Fanny Ketter (1996-)

External links

 Nærmar seg eitt år som koronafaste - no blir det juleferie på skulen [Approaching one year, as "corona-stuck" - now there will be (a) Christmas vacation at school.] (19. November 2020) NRK
 UWC Red Cross Nordic Website
 UWC Red Cross Nordic Extra-Academic Program
 Leirskule at UWC Red Cross Nordic
 UWC International Website
 UWC Red Cross Nordic Pictures and Panoramas
 Haugland Rehabilitation Center
 Fjaler Kommune

International Baccalaureate schools in Norway
Educational institutions established in 1995
International schools in Norway
1995 establishments in Norway